Marco Maurer (born February 21, 1988) is a Swiss professional ice hockey defenceman who currently plays with Genève-Servette HC of the National League (NL). He previously played with EV Zug, the SC Rapperswil-Jona Lakers, the ZSC Lions, HC Lugano and EHC Biel.

Playing career
Maurer made his National League debut playing with EV Zug during the 2005–06 NLA season.

On January 17, 2019, Maurer agreed to a two-year contract for the 2019/20 and 2020/21 season to return to Genève-Servette HC. 

On June 2, 2020, Maurer was signed to an early one-year contract extension by Servette through the 2021/22 season.

References

External links

1988 births
Living people
EHC Biel players
Genève-Servette HC players
Lausanne HC players
HC Lugano players
SC Rapperswil-Jona Lakers players
Swiss ice hockey defencemen
ZSC Lions players
EV Zug players